Raj Karega Khalsa (which translates as The Pure will Rule) is a slogan representing the Sikh idea of sovereignty and it is recited at the conclusion of Ardas.

Raj Karega Khalsa, lit. "the Khalsa shall rule," a phrase expressive of the will of the Sikh people to sovereignty, is part of the anthem which follows the litany or ardas recited at the end of every religious service of the Sikhs. While the ardas is said by an officiant or any Sikh leading the sangat standing and facing Guru Granth Sahib jii, the anthem is recited aloud in unison by everyone present, with responses from the assembly.

While not present in early Sikh scripture, it is found in the third dohra, or couplet, of Guru Gobind Singh's Guru Maneyo Granth verse, conferred upon the congregation upon the founding of the Khalsa in 1699. The couplet "Raj Karega Khalsa, Aki Rahe Na Koe. Khuar Hue Sabh Milenge, Bache Saran Jo Hoe" (The pure shall rule, no opponent will remain, those separated will unite and all the devotees shall be saved) is also attested at the end of Bhai Nand Lal Singh's Rehitnama.

The relevant portion of the original ardās which was recited in history is:

The colonial British banned parts of this ardās as they feared its martial and potential political implications.  Therefore, they mentioned not to say the first two stanzas and only start with "Raj Karega Khalsa. The translated ardās with the preceding lines included is:

When the appropriate time came, the Sikh Army, in the command of Baba Baghel Singh, Sardar Jassa Singh Ahluwalia, Sardar Jassa Singh Ramgarhia and few other chieftains, conquered Delhi and did seva (service) of all the historical gurdwaras of Delhi. Even after conquering, they didn’t claim the crown and simply asked the ruler of Delhi to rule with “conscience” and not to put the ‘jizya’ tax on non Muslims. There are many places in Delhi showing the invasion of Delhi by Sikh Army, including Tees  Hazaari, Mori gate and many more.

References

Sikh literature
Sikh terminology